Kim Hyeon-jung (also transliterated Hyun-jung or Hyeon-jeong, born October 31, 1992 in Seoul) is a South Korean figure skater. She is the 2008 & 2009 South Korean silver medalist.

She made her international debut in the 2007–2008 season, when she competed on the 2007–2008 ISU Junior Grand Prix in two events, with a highest placement of 9th. She competed at the 2008 World Junior Figure Skating Championships, where she placed 14th. She made her senior international debut at the 2009 Four Continents, where she placed 14th. Now she is a figure skating coach and she is teaching her younger brother, Kim Hwan-jin.

Competitive highlights

 J = Junior level

Detailed results

References

 Detailed results and protocols at the New Zealand Ice Skating Association

External links
 Tracings.net profile
 

South Korean female single skaters
1992 births
Living people
Figure skaters from Seoul